Rosenthal is a German and Jewish surname meaning "rose valley". Notable people with the name include:

A 
Abe M. Rosenthal (1922–2006), New York Times editor and columnist
Albert Rosenthal (1863–1939), American portrait artist
Albert J. Rosenthal (1919–2010), American legal scholar
Amy Krouse Rosenthal (1965-2017), American author
Arnold Jack Rosenthal (1923–2010), Louisiana politician; see Peter Beer
Arthur Rosenthal (1887–1959), German mathematician

B 
Barbara Rosenthal (born 1948), artist and writer
Ben Rosenthal (baseball) (born 1979), American baseball coach
Benjamin Stanley Rosenthal, United States Congressman (1962–1983)
Bernard "Tony" Rosenthal (1914–2009), American abstract sculptor
Bernard Rosenthal (scholar), American scholar of the Salem witchcraft trials

C 
Sir Charles Rosenthal (1875–1954), Australian general of World War I
Chuck Rosenthal (district attorney), Republican District Attorney of Harris County, Texas
Constantin Daniel Rosenthal, Wallachian painter and revolutionary

D 
Daniel Rosenthal, American politician
David Rosenthal (disambiguation), multiple people
Dean Rosenthal, American composer
Denise Rosenthal, Chilean actress, singer, and songwriter
Dietmar Rosenthal, Russian linguist
Doreen Rosenthal (born 1938), Australian psychologist, adolescent health and HIV/AIDS researcher

E 
Ed Rosenthal, author and publisher arrested for use of medical marijuana
Edward Rosenthal (1914-1991), American businessman
Elisabeth Rosenthal, American physician and journalist
Erwin Rosenthal (1904–1991), German-born British Hebrew scholar and orientalist

F 
François Rozenthal, French ice hockey player
Frank "Lefty" Rosenthal, Las Vegas entrepreneur
Franz Rosenthal (1914–2003), scholar of Arabic literature and Islam

G 
Gerry Rosenthal, American actor and musician
Gert Rosenthal, Guatemalan statesman
Gregory Samantha Rosenthal, American historian and writer

H 
Hannah Rosenthal, politician active in Jewish causes
Hans Rosenthal (1925-1987), German television presenter
Harald Rosenthal, German marine biologist
Harold Rosenthal, British music critic
Harold Wallace Rosenthal, administrative assistant of senator Jacob K. Javits
Heinrich Rosenthal (1846–1916), Estonian nationalist leader, doctor and author
Helen Rosenthal, American politician

I 
Ida Rosenthal, bra designer and co-founder of Maidenform
Ilena Rosenthal, breast implant activist

J 
Jack Rosenthal, British playwright and television writer
Jaime Rosenthal, Honduran banker and politician
Jane Rosenthal, film producer
Jean Rosenthal (1912–1969), pioneer of theatrical lighting design
Jeff Rosenthal, Canadian statistician and author
Jenna Rosenthal, American volleyball player
Jim Rosenthal, UK sports presenter
Joe Rosenthal, American photographer

K 
Ken Rosenthal, American sportswriter and reporter

L 
Laurence Rosenthal, film and television composer
Leah Rosenthal (1879 - 1930), Australian nurse who served in World War I
Linda Rosenthal, American politician
Lukas Rosenthal, German rugby union player

M 
Manuel Rosenthal (1904–2003), French composer and conductor
Marc Rosenthal, American singer-songwriter
Márk Rózsavölgyi, Hungarian violinist and composer, the father of csárdás, born Mordecai Rosenthal
Maurice Rozenthal (born 1975), French ice hockey player
Mike Rosenthal (born 1977), American football player
Moriz Rosenthal, Polish-American pianist

N 
Norman E. Rosenthal, South African author

P 
Paul Rosenthal (Colorado politician), American politician
Paul Rosenthal (Minnesota politician), American politician
Paul Rosenthal (violinist), American violinist
Peter Rosenthal, Toronto mathematician and lawyer
Phil Rosenthal, Chicago Tribune columnist
Philip Rosenthal, television producer

R 
Richard Rosenthal (disambiguation), multiple people
Rick Rosenthal, American film director
Robert Rosenthal (disambiguation), multiple people
Ronny Rosenthal (born 1963), Israeli footballer

S 
Samuel Rosenthal, Polish-French chess master
Sam Rosenthal, American musician
Sanford Rosenthal, American scientist
Sean Rosenthal (born 1980), American beach volleyball player
Sebastián Rozental (born 1976), Chilean professional soccer player

T 
Ted Rosenthal (born 1959), American jazz pianist, composer and educator
Trevor Rosenthal, American baseball pitcher
Tom Rosenthal, British musician
Tom Rosenthal, British actor and comedian

U 
Uri Rosenthal (born 1945), Dutch politician and political scientist, Minister of Foreign Affairs (2010–2012)

Y 
 Yosef Rosenthal (1844–1913), Hebrew writer

See also
 Rosendahl (disambiguation)
 Rosenthal Islands, Antarctica

References 

German-language surnames
Jewish surnames
Yiddish-language surnames